is a Japanese model, actress, and gravure idol.

Life and career
Kawamura was born in Tokyo on October 10, 1982. She has appeared in numerous bikini and lingerie magazines, commercial and print-ads, calendars and TV shows, and she has also released several gravure videos and photobooks.

Kawamura appeared in the 2008 film Umeda Yūko no kokuhaku as a friend of the main character, but her first starring role was in the March 2010 erotic suspense film  which was directed by Yutaka Ōgi.

She also starred in the 2009 V-cinema production Chanbara Beauty: The Movie - Vortex.

She was a member of the Ebisu Muscats.

On April 17, 2018, Kawamura announced on her blog that she has cervical cancer and will be undergoing surgery.

Filmography
  (October 2008)
  (March 2010)
  (March 2010)
  (October 2010)
  (May 2012)

References

External links

Living people
1982 births
Actresses from Tokyo
Japanese gravure idols
Japanese television personalities
Ebisu Muscats